Touchdown is the third album from the Brighton-based band Brakes, released in 2009 on Fat Cat Records.

Track listing
"Two Shocks" - 3:49
"Don’t Take Me To Space (Man)" - 2:41
"Red Rag" - 1:33
"Worry About It Later" - 2:03
"Crush On You" - 3:14
"Eternal Return" - 2:32
"Do You Feel The Same?" - 1:33
"Ancient Mysteries" - 1:57  [Charles Douglas cover]
"Oh! Forever" - 4:08
"Hey Hey" - 2:18
"Why Tell The Truth (When It’s Easier To Lie)" - 3:32
"Leaving England" - 3:50
"First Dance" (hidden track) - 2:35

References

Brakes (band) albums
2009 albums
FatCat Records albums